Thomas Reid (18 April 1886 – 12 October 1968) was a Canadian businessman and politician in the province of British Columbia.

Reid was born in Cambuslang, Scotland. In 1909, he moved to Canada and in 1911 married Mary Jeanie Masson, also from Scotland. Together they raised a family of two sons and two daughters. The Reids moved to Surrey in 1918 where Thomas Reid managed the Pacific Car and Foundry Company.

In 1922 Reid was elected to office as a Councillor for Surrey and served two years in this capacity. From 1924 to 1930 he was elected annually to the position of Reeve. During this time he was twice appointed head of the Union of British Columbia Municipalities. In 1930, Reid entered federal politics and was elected Liberal Member of Parliament (MP) for the New Westminster riding. He represented this riding for nineteen years. Reid was a founding member of the International Pacific Coast Sockeye Salmon Commission and served as chairman from 1937 to 1967. 

Reid was a vocal advocate for cultural genocide, arguing while a Liberal MP for the complete removal Canadians of Japanese ancestry from the province of BC and from Canada altogether. His actions supported the mass clearance of over 20,000 British Columbians in 1942.

He became Parliamentary Assistant to the Ministers of Fisheries and of National Revenue in 1948 and in 1949 assisted the Minister of National Health and Welfare. In 1948 he was summoned to the Senate.

Senator Reid Elementary School in Surrey, BC is named in his honour.

Election results (partial)

Notes

External links
 

1886 births
1968 deaths
Canadian senators from British Columbia
Liberal Party of Canada MPs
Liberal Party of Canada senators
Members of the House of Commons of Canada from British Columbia
People from Cambuslang
Canadian people of Scottish descent
Politicians from South Lanarkshire
Scottish emigrants to Canada